Erdem Canpolat (born 13 April 2001) is a German professional footballer who plays as a goalkeeper for Turkish club Kasımpaşa.

Career
Canpolat is a youth product of Bochum, Hamborn 07, and Schalke. On 15 September 2020, he transferred to the Turkish club Kasımpaşa. He made his first senior debut with Kasımpaşa in a 3–0 Turkish Cup win over 24 Erzincanspor on 26 November 2020. He made his professional debut with Gaziantep in a 2–1 Süper Lig loss to Sivasspor on 15 May 2021.

Personal life
Born in Germany, Canpolat is of Turkish descent.

References

External links

DFB Profile
Kicker Profile

2001 births
Living people
Footballers from Duisburg
German footballers
German people of Turkish descent
Association football goalkeepers
Kasımpaşa S.K. footballers
Süper Lig players